Mistérios is an album by American jazz trumpeter Wallace Roney, recorded in 1994 and released on the Warner Bros. label.

Reception

The AllMusic review by Scott Yanow stated: "Trumpeter Wallace Roney avoids the standard repertoire altogether on this CD, ... but, try as hard as he may, he still sounds like Miles Davis every time he hits a long tone or plays a doubletime passage. Backed by a small orchestra that mostly interprets Gil Goldstein arrangements, Roney is the main soloist throughout this interesting ballad-dominated set".

In The Washington Post, Geoffrey Himes wrote: "Not only was this recording supervised by Davis's old producer, Teo Macero, but it features Evans-like orchestral arrangements by Gil Goldstein, who had transcribed and adapted Evans's charts for Miles Davis & Quincy Jones Live at Montreux ... Because Roney emphasizes feeling over technique, Misterios has the chance to connect with a non-jazz audience as few acoustic jazz albums have since Davis's heyday".

In JazzTimes, David R. Adler noted: "Misterios, his debut for the label, is in many respects a marvelous piece of work—with jazz ensemble and strings interpreting works by Pat Metheny, Jaco Pastorius, Egberto Gismonti and, bizarrely enough, Dolly Parton. The label wanted a cover of a Grammy-winning song, and Roney averted a potential disaster, turning “I Will Always Love You,” the Parton-penned Whitney Houston hit, into a thing of enigmatic beauty, an unabashed valentine to his departed friend and mentor, Miles Davis".

Track listing
 "Meu Menino" (Danilo Caymmi, Ana Terra) – 6:15
 "In Her Family" (Pat Metheny) – 4:47
 "Michelle" (John Lennon, Paul McCartney) – 6:31
 "Cafe" (Egberto Gismonti) – 6:28
 "Mistérios" (Joyce, Mauricio Maestro) – 4:52
 "Last to Know" (Metheny) – 6:47
 "Memoria e Fado" (Gismonti) – 5:16
 "71+" (Jaco Pastorius) – 6:51
 "Muerte" (Astor Piazzolla) – 5:48
 "I Will Always Love You" (Dolly Parton) – 5:19

Personnel 
Wallace Roney − trumpet, arranger
Gil Goldstein – arranger, conductor, keyboards 
Ravi Coltrane (track 9), Antoine Roney (tracks 4, 6 & 8) − tenor saxophone
Geri Allen − piano, arranger 
Clarence Seay − double bass
Eric Allen − drums
Steve Berrios, Steve Thornton, Valtinho Anastacio – percussion
Orchestra:
Eric Wyrick (concertmaster), Liang-Ping How, Sandra Park – violin
Louise Schulman, Maureen Gallagher – viola
Eugene J. Moye Jr., Richard Locker – cello
Andrew Sterman, Chris Hunter, Harvey Estrin, Lawrence Feldman, Robert Steen – flute, recorder

References 

1994 albums
Wallace Roney albums
Albums produced by Teo Macero
Warner Records albums